Miloš Radanović (Serbian Cyrillic: Милош Радановић, born 5 November 1980) is a Montenegrin retired football player. He last played as a goalkeeper for Rudar Pljevlja.

Club career
Born in Pljevlja, he started his career in his hometown club, an oscillating First and Second League club FK Rudar Pljevlja where he became the main goalkeeper, and stayed until January 2004. After a brief, half season, spell in FK Sutjeska, in 2004, he moves to the ambitious FK Budućnost Banatski Dvor, a club that was playing in the Second Yugoslav League but, was promoted, the next season, to the First League of FR Yugoslavia. Once there, the club changed his name to FK Banat, the name that still uses, and Radanović became one of the best goalkeepers in Serbian football. In the summer of 2006, Miloš moves abroad to Cyprus where he plays for Olympiakos Nicosia. Next, in 2007, he was back, signing with FK Smederevo, now playing in a separate Serbian Superliga, and, since 2008, he is back to his first club, FK Rudar, now playing in the Montenegrin First League.

External sources
 
 Player profile at Rudar official website 
 Profile at SoccerTerminal 

1980 births
Living people
Sportspeople from Pljevlja
Association football goalkeepers
Serbia and Montenegro footballers
Montenegrin footballers
FK Rudar Pljevlja players
FK Sutjeska Nikšić players
FK Banat Zrenjanin players
Olympiakos Nicosia players
FK Smederevo players
Damash Gilan players
FK Mornar players
First League of Serbia and Montenegro players
Serbian SuperLiga players
Cypriot First Division players
Montenegrin First League players
Azadegan League players
Montenegrin expatriate footballers
Expatriate footballers in Cyprus
Montenegrin expatriate sportspeople in Cyprus
Expatriate footballers in Serbia
Montenegrin expatriate sportspeople in Serbia
Expatriate footballers in Iran
Montenegrin expatriate sportspeople in Iran